Opernwerkstatt am Rhein  is a theatre in Hürth, North Rhine-Westphalia, Germany.           

The productions combine opera, cabaret and improvisational theater. As a non-profit association, the opera workshop is dedicated to promoting young artists on the one hand and pursuing social projects to integrate socially disadvantaged groups on the other.

Theatres in North Rhine-Westphalia